Vassdalseggi is the tallest mountain in Rogaland county, Norway.

See also
List of mountains of Norway
List of highest points of Norwegian counties

References

Mountains of Vestfold og Telemark
Mountains of Rogaland
Suldal
Vinje
Highest points of Norwegian counties